Heigl is a German language surname. Notable people with the surname include:

 Katherine Heigl (born 1978), American actress, film producer and fashion model
 Hubertus-Maria Ritter von Heigl (1897–1985), Generalmajor in the Wehrmacht during World War II
 Philipp Heigl (born 1993), Austrian cyclo-cross cyclist

See also
 Catherine Hiegel
 Karl August von Heigel

German-language surnames